HMS Bramham (L51) was a  of the Royal Navy laid down in Alexander Stephen and Sons shipyards Govan, Scotland on 7 April 1941. She was launched on 29 January 1942 and commissioned into the Royal Navy on 16 June 1942. She was named after the Bramham Moor Hunt and has been the only Royal Navy warship to bear the name. She was adopted by the town of Beverley in the East Riding of Yorkshire during the Warship Week savings campaign of 1942.

Royal Navy service

In the following August she served in Operation Pedestal, a mission to deliver supplies to the besieged island of Malta, as an escorting destroyer. In the last stages of the operation Bramham along with two other destroyers,  and  took on the final tow of the tanker  into Malta.

Royal Hellenic Navy service

In March 1943 Bramham was transferred to the Royal Hellenic Navy and renamed Themistoklis after the ancient Greek commander Themistocles. She served until 1959 and was then returned to the Royal Navy on 12 November 1959. She was scrapped in Greece in 1960.

References

Publications
 
  The Hunts: a history of the design, development and careers of the 86 destroyers of this class built for the Royal and Allied Navies during World War II, John English, World Ship Society, 1987, 

Hunt-class destroyers of the Royal Navy
Ships built on the River Clyde
1942 ships
World War II destroyers of the United Kingdom
Hunt-class destroyers of the Hellenic Navy
World War II destroyers of Greece
Maritime incidents in November 1942
Royal Navy ship names